The discography of Sy Smith, an American R&B singer, consists of four studio albums, two compilation albums, eight singles and one video album.

Smith released her first studio album Psykosoul in 2000, which spawned the singles "Gladly" and "Good N Strong". Following the release of her first album, Smith left Hollywood. In early 2005, she began her own recording label known as Psyko! Inc. In September 2005, Smith released her second album The Syberspace Social, which spawned the single "Fa'Sho". Smith released her concert DVD Sy Smith Live: Worship At The Temple, in 2007. In 2008, Smith released her third studio album, Conflict, with the lead single "Fly Away With Me". The single charted at #38 on the Top 40 Hot Adult R&B Chart. In 2010, Smith released a single "Truth", followed by her best-of album Syberselects: A Collection of Sy Smith Favorites. In March 2012, Smith released her fourth studio album, Fast and Curious.

Albums

Studio albums

Compilations

EPs
 Selections from Psykosoul (Hollywood, 1999)
 One Like Me (Psyko!, 2002)
 The Syberspace Social Vinyl EP (Psyko!, 2007)
 Sometimes A Rose Will Get A Remix (Psyko!, 2019)

Singles

Featured singles

Other appearances

Soundtracks appearances

Album appearances

Videography

Music videos

Video Releases
 Sy Smith Live: Worship At The Temple (2007)

References

 

Sy Smith
Discographies of American artists
Rhythm and blues discographies